Magnin is a surname. Notable people with the surname include:

Albert Magnin (1846-1906), American politician
Antoine Magnin (1848-1926), French botanist
Charles Magnin (1793–1862), French writer
Cyril Magnin (1899–1988), American businessman
Edgar Magnin (1890–1984), American Reform rabbi
Eduardo Magnin (born 1969), Argentine footballer
Gérard Magnin (born 1951), French businessman
Isaac Magnin (1842-1907), American carver and gilder; co-founder of I. Magnin, an upscale women's clothing store in San Francisco, California.
Ludovic Magnin (born 1979), Swiss footballer
Mae Magnin Brussell (1922–1988), American radio personality.
Mary Ann Magnin (1850-1943), co-founder of I. Magnin, an upscale women's clothing store in San Francisco, California.

See also
I. Magnin, department store in San Francisco, California
Joseph Magnin Co., department store in San Francisco, California
Musée Magnin, museum in Dijon, France